Arvind Joshi (1936  29 January 2021) was an Indian film and theatre actor, playwright and director known for his work in Gujarati theatre and Gujarati cinema. He was the father of actors Manasi Joshi Roy and Sharman Joshi.

Biography
He was born and raised in Mumbai. He worked as a theatre artist for around a decade before starting his career in Hindi film industry. He played major roles in Gujarati films including Garvo Garasiyo, Gher Gher Matina Chula and Dhola Maru, Tadka Chhaya, Mehndi Rang Lagyo and Govaliyo. He acted in Hindi films like Sholay (1975), Ittefaq (1969), Apmaan Ki Aag (1990), Ab To Aaja Saajan Mere, and Love Marriage.

He died on 29 January 2021 in Vile Parle, Mumbai, aged 84. He was married and had two children, Manasi Joshi Roy and Sharman Joshi.

He acted in the play like Rahuketu, Lady Lalkunwar, Khelando, Banshayya, Baraf Na Chehra, Jaldi Kar Koi Joee Jashe.

Filmography

Hindi films
Ittefaq (1969)
Gupt Gyan (1974)
Sholay (1975)
Pati Parmeshwar (1978)
Love Marriage (1984)
Chhota Aadmi (1986)
Uddhar (1986)
Naam (1986)
Thikana (1987)
 Kharidar (1988)
Apmaan Ki Aag (1990)
 Pyaar Ka Toofan (1990)
 Ab To Aaja Saajan Mere (1994)
Godmother (1999)

Gujarati films
Chundadi Chokha (1961)
Kanku (1969)
Hasta Melap (1969)
Veli Ni Aavya Phool (1970)
Janamteep (1974)
Raa Maandlik (1975)
Ver No Waras (1976)
Daku Rani Ganga (1976)
Gher Gher Matina Chula (1977)
Garvo Garasiyo (1979)
Putra Vadhu (1982)
Dhola Maru (1983)
Footpath Ni Rani (1984)
Maa Na Aansu (1984)
Nana Vagar No Nathiyo (1984)
Jagat Jogini Maa Khodiyar (2006)
Char Dishayen Maa Chaherma (2000)

References

External links
 

Male actors from Gujarat
1936 births
2021 deaths
Male actors in Gujarati-language films
Male actors in Hindi cinema